Rhipidarctia invaria is a moth in the family Erebidae. It was described by Francis Walker in 1856. It is found in Angola, Cameroon, the Republic of the Congo, the Democratic Republic of the Congo, Gabon, Ivory Coast, Nigeria, Sierra Leone, Tanzania and Uganda.

The larvae feed on Cola species and Theobroma cacao.

References

Moths described in 1856
Syntomini